Semyono-Alexandrovka is a rural locality (a selo) and the administrative center of Semyono-Alexandrovskoye Rural Settlement, Bobrovsky District, Voronezh Oblast, Russia. The population was 1,772 as of 2010. There are 14 streets.

Geography 
Semyono-Alexandrovka is located 22 km southeast of Bobrov (the district's administrative centre) by road. Annovka is the nearest rural locality.

References 

Rural localities in Bobrovsky District